Elachista disemiella is a moth of the family Elachistidae. It is found in France, on the Iberian Peninsula and in Italy and Hungary.

The larvae feed on Ampelodesmos mauritanicus and Deschampsia cespitosa. They mine the leaves of their host plant.

References

disemiella
Moths described in 1847
Moths of Europe